Wilavan Apinyapong (RTGS: Wilawan Aphinyaphong, born June 6, 1984) is a Thai professional volleyball player who plays for Azerbaijan Club Igtisadchi Baku in the  Azerbaijan Super League and the Thai National Team as an Outside Hitter. She was the captain for the Thailand women's national volleyball team from 2008 to 2016 when Pleumjit took the captain role.

Apinyapong led the Thai team to win the first gold medal at 2009 Asian Women's Volleyball Championship and beaten China 3-1 for the first time in history. She again led the team to victory in the 2013 Asian Women's Volleyball Championship where she also received the MVP award of the event.

Career
Apinyapong signed with the Spanish professional club IBSA Club Voleibol for the 2007–2008 season of the Spanish Superliga, playing with her countrymate Nootsara Tomkom.
For the next two seasons, she and some of her Thai teammates, such as Malika Kanthong, Amporn Hyapha signed with the Turkish club Ereğli Belediye and had a successful club career there.

In 2010, she signed with the Chinese club Guangzhou Evergrande under coach Jenny Lang Ping. Along with the Olympics MVP Feng Kun, Yang Hao, Logan Tom, Jovana Brakočević. She was benched most of the time during the season because of the limitation on foreigner players were only two foreign players were allowed on the court.

Next season, she moved to another Chinese club team Fujian Xi Meng Bao and played alongside good friend Pleumjit Thinkaow and Chinese Olympics bronze medalist Xu Yunli.

The Thai team went on to finish in fourth place at the 2012 World Grand Prix, making it the best result for Thailand since 2002 as the Thai team participated for the first time. After winning the gold medal against China at the 2012 Asian Women's Cup Volleyball Championship, Apinyapong and her 6 other teammates signed for Igtisadchi Baku and helped the team to win the silver medal at the 2012–13 Azerbaijan Women's Volleyball Super League. They also qualified for the 2013/2014 CEV Women's Champions League for the very first time since the club was founded.

In 2013 she received the MVP award at the 2013 Asian Women's Volleyball Championship . She extended the contract with Igtisadchi Baku for one more year and was subsequently appointed captain. In late 2013, after winning the gold medal at 2013 Southeast Asian Games, Apinyapong said that she will not go to compete at the 2014 FIVB Women's World Championship because she is set to join the 2014 Asian Games in Incheon, South Korea, considering that she might have a chance to win at least one medal.

In 2015 she played with the local Bangkok Glass on loan. She also played on loan with Bangkok Glass in 2016. She moved to the Vietnamese VTV Bình Điền Long An in 2017, playing on loan.

She is on the list 2019 Korea-Thailand all star super match competition.

After not qualifying to the 2020 Summer Olympics, Wilavan decided to retire after representing Thailand for 20 years, along with Nootsara.

Personal life
Apinyapong married Nattapong Kesapan, at Kham Sakaesaeng, Nakhon Ratchasima on 7 May 2017. Apinyapong graduated from Bangkok University with a bachelor and a master's degree.

Clubs 

  Vinh Long VC (2006–2007)
  Sang Som (2007–2008)
  IBSA Club Voleibol (2007–2008)
  Ereğli Belediye (2008–2010)
  Federbrau (2010–2011)
  Guangzhou Evergrande (2010–2011)
  Chang (2011–2012)
  Fujian Xi Meng Bao (2011–2012)
  Igtisadchi Baku (2012–2014)
  Nakhon Ratchasima (2013–2015)
  Bangkok Glass (2015) (loan)
  Supreme Chonburi (2015–2021)
  Bangkok Glass (2016) (loan)
  VTV BĐ LA (2017) (loan)

Awards

Individuals
 2011 Asian Club Championship – "Most Valuable Player"
 2013 Asian Championship – "Most Valuable Player"
 2014–15 Thailand League – "Best Scorer"
 2014–15 Thailand League – "Best Outside Spiker"
 2016 Asian Club Championship – "Best Outside Spiker"
 2016 VTV Cup Championship – "Best Outside Spiker"
 2016–17 Thailand League – "Best Outside Spiker"
 2018–19 Thailand League – "Best Outside Spiker"

Clubs
 2006 Thailand League –  Champion, with Nakhon Ratchasima
 2010–11 Chinese League –  Runner-up, with Guangzhou Evergrande
 2012–13 Azerbaijan Super League –  Runner-up, with Igtisadchi Baku
 2013–14 Thailand League –  Champion, with Nakhon Ratchasima
 2015–16 Thailand League –  Runner-up, with Supreme Chonburi
 2016–17 Thailand League –  Champion, with Supreme Chonburi
 2017–18 Thailand League –  Champion, with Supreme Chonburi
 2018–19 Thailand League –  Runner-up, with Supreme Chonburi
 2017 Thai–Denmark Super League –  Champion, with Supreme Chonburi
 2018 Thai–Denmark Super League –  Champion, with Supreme Chonburi
 2019 Thai–Denmark Super League –  Champion, with Supreme Chonburi
 2009 Asian Club Championship –  Champion, with Federbrau
 2010 Asian Club Championship –  Champion, with Federbrau
 2011 Asian Club Championship –  Champion, with Chang
 2012 Asian Club Championship –  Bronze medal, with Chang
 2015 Asian Club Championship –  Champion, with Bangkok Glass
 2016 Asian Club Championship –  Bronze medal, with Bangkok Glass
 2017 Asian Club Championship –  Champion, with Supreme Chonburi
 2018 Asian Club Championship –  Champion, with Supreme Chonburi
 2019 Asian Club Championship –  Runner-up, with Supreme Chonburi

Royal decorations
 2013 -  Commander (Third Class) of The Most Exalted Order of the White Elephant
 2010 -  Companion (Fourth Class) of The Most Admirable Order of the Direkgunabhorn

References

External links

Living people
Wilavan Apinyapong
1984 births
Asian Games medalists in volleyball
Volleyball players at the 2006 Asian Games
Volleyball players at the 2010 Asian Games
Volleyball players at the 2014 Asian Games
Volleyball players at the 2018 Asian Games
Igtisadchi Baku volleyball players
Wilavan Apinyapong
Wilavan Apinyapong
Wilavan Apinyapong
Wilavan Apinyapong
Wilavan Apinyapong
Wilavan Apinyapong
Medalists at the 2014 Asian Games
Medalists at the 2018 Asian Games
Wilavan Apinyapong
Southeast Asian Games medalists in volleyball
Competitors at the 2001 Southeast Asian Games
Competitors at the 2003 Southeast Asian Games
Competitors at the 2005 Southeast Asian Games
Competitors at the 2007 Southeast Asian Games
Competitors at the 2009 Southeast Asian Games
Competitors at the 2011 Southeast Asian Games
Competitors at the 2013 Southeast Asian Games
Competitors at the 2015 Southeast Asian Games
Competitors at the 2017 Southeast Asian Games
Competitors at the 2019 Southeast Asian Games
Outside hitters
Thai expatriate sportspeople in Turkey
Thai expatriate sportspeople in China
Expatriate volleyball players in Spain
Expatriate volleyball players in Turkey
Expatriate volleyball players in China
Expatriate volleyball players in Azerbaijan
Expatriate volleyball players in Vietnam